Richard Lee Powell (May 21, 1904 – April 29, 1986) was an American football player. He played college football at Davis & Elkins and professional football in the National Football League (NFL) as an end for the New York Giants in 1932 and the Cincinnati Reds in 1933. He appeared in five NFL games.

References

1904 births
1986 deaths
Davis & Elkins Senators football players
New York Giants players
Cincinnati Reds (NFL) players
Players of American football from West Virginia